Tintin: Destination Adventure is a video game loosely based on the series The Adventures of Tintin, the comics series by Belgian cartoonist Hergé. It was released for Microsoft Windows and PlayStation in Europe in late 2001.

Gameplay
The gameplay is similar to the previous two Tintin games (Prisoners of the Sun and Tintin in Tibet), with the exception in some parts where the player can operate vehicles. Aside from this the only other enhancement is the use of full 3D for the game.

Release
Tintin: Destination Adventure was released for PlayStation in September 2001 and for Windows in November 2001.

External links
The Cult of Tintin at Tintinologist.org

2001 video games
Europe-exclusive video games
Infogrames games
Naval video games
PlayStation (console) games
Video games based on Tintin
Video games developed in the United Kingdom
Video games set in Indonesia
Video games set in the Middle East
Video games set on the Moon
Video games set in Scotland
Windows games
Single-player video games